Terras do Desembargador, also known as Campo das Salésias, was a football dirt field in Lisbon, Portugal. It hosted football matches of Sport Lisboa.
In 1903, football was a growing sport, and Terras do Desembargador was Lisbon's main field for playing football.

It had no fences and bystanders can freely enter the field and disrupt  match. When a ball was lost to outside the field it was difficult to recover it because of the open spaces. Inconveniently it was also shared with the Portuguese Army who used it as an exercise field, so it would often be completely destroyed after a set of exercises.
It was in this field that a group a friends after a match decided to create Sport Lisboa. 6 friendlies were played, Sport Lisboa won 5, lost 1, scored 13 goals and conceded 2.

Benfica left in 1907 for Campo da Feiteira, seeking more privacy and exclusively of their own field.

References

External links
Zerozero profile 

Terras do Desembargador
Terras do Desembargador
Sports venues completed in 1903